Shailer Park is a suburb in the City of Logan, Queensland, Australia.

Geography 
Shailer Park is a suburb of mainly middle class residential areas, and sits on hilly terrain between the Pacific Motorway and extensive forest and bushland to the north. The north-eastern part of the suburb is sometimes known as Kimberley Park, after a residential estate located in the area.

Shailer Park is a centre for employment, entertainment, and leisure in southeast Queensland. The Logan Hyperdome, a major regional shopping centre, is located in Shailer Park, and other commercial and community facilities have developed nearby. Largely because of this, the Queensland Government listed the suburb as a major activity centre in the South East Queensland Regional Plan 2005–2026. The Loganholme bus station, a major bus interchange is located at the Logan Hyperdome.

History
The suburb is named after Francis Frederick Rising Shailer and his wife Catherine, who arrived with their children in the area in 1866. Like many farmers in the area, they first grew cotton and later sugar. The Shailers were probably best known for their fruit growing and operated the first citrus orchard in southern Queensland, situated in Slacks Creek. The land selected by Francis Shailer was situated to the north of the current Shailer Road. Francis Shailer was a teacher at the first and second Slacks Creek Provisional Schools. He was also the first Clerk of the Tingalpa Divisional Board in 1880. The Shailers intermarried with other pioneering families in the district including the Dennis family, who were related to the Markwells, as well as the Murrays, who had an adjoining property along the Logan River. The property still exists at the end of Murrays Road.

Francis’ son Alfred later farmed the area now known as Daisy Hill. At that time it was called Oakey Mountain and was owned by his grandfather, James Dennis. Alf's son Glen Shailer also farmed this property. Glen carried on the family's tradition of involvement in local government. He was elected to the Albert Shire Council in 1961 and served almost continuously until 1985. He was elected Mayor of Logan City in 1982 and served for one term.

Shailer Park was originally named as a district on 1 September 1971, then as a sub-district of Slacks Creek on 1 September 1977. It was named and bounded as a locality on 31 March 1979 and revised to be a suburb on 31 August 1991.

The Kimberley Park estate was developed in 1973.

Shailer Park State High School opened on 29 January 1980.

Shailer Park State School opened on 25 January 1982.

Kimberley Park State School opened 29 January 1985. 

The Logan Hyperdome shopping centre opened in 1989 on the site on the site of the former Wild Waters Water Slide Park.

The median age of the Shailer Park population was 36 years, 1 year below the national median of 37.  68.5% of people living in Shailer Park were born in Australia. The other top responses for country of birth were New Zealand 8.7%, England 6.8%, South Africa 1.7%, Scotland 0.9%, Philippines 0.7%.  88.7% of people spoke only English at home; the next most common languages were 0.6% Afrikaans, 0.6% Mandarin, 0.5% Samoan, 0.5% Greek, 0.5% Spanish.

The Logan Hyperdome Library opened in 1998 with a major refurbishment in 2014.

Education 

Shailer Park State School is a government primary (Prep-6) school for boys and girls at Bulwarna Street. In 2018, the school had an enrolment of 530 students with 37 teachers (33 full-time equivalent) and 22 non-teaching staff (14 full-time equivalent). It includes a special education program.

Kimberley Park State School is a government primary (Prep-6) school for boys and girls at Floret Street. In 2018, the school had an enrolment of 868 students with 67 teachers (59 full-time equivalent) and 28 non-teaching staff (19 full-time equivalent). It includes a  special education program.

Shailer Park State High School is a government secondary (7-12) school for boys and girls at Leaf Street. In 2018, the school had an enrolment of 913 students with 80 teachers (75 full-time equivalent) and 29 non-teaching staff (23 full-time equivalent). It includes a special education program

Amenities 
The Logan City Council operate the Logan Hyperdome Library at the Logan Hyperdome.

References

External links

 

Suburbs of Logan City
1991 establishments in Australia
Populated places established in 1991